Designer stubble is a facial hair style which is a short growth of beard, aimed to affect a rugged masculine or deliberately unkempt appearance. Initially made popular in the 1980s by singer George Michael and actor Don Johnson, the style later regained popularity after being worn by actor Tom Cruise in the 2000s and singers Craig David and Jason Derulo in the 2010s. Several companies now manufacture beard trimmers designed specifically to maintain the designer stubble look. Typically created by trimming the beard to a length of 13 mm, designer stubble is roughly three days worth of growth, in contrast to the shorter 'five o'clock shadow'.

See also
 List of facial hairstyles

References

1980s fashion
1990s fashion
2000s fashion
2010s fashion
Facial hair styles
Hair anatomy